Axel Peter Rudolf Frank (11 June 1888 – 3 August 1970) was a Swedish wrestler. He competed at the 1908 Summer Olympics and the 1912 Summer Olympics.

References

External links
 

1888 births
1970 deaths
Olympic wrestlers of Sweden
Wrestlers at the 1908 Summer Olympics
Wrestlers at the 1912 Summer Olympics
Swedish male sport wrestlers
Sportspeople from Malmö
20th-century Swedish people